ReadiBus is an on-demand transport service for disabled people in the area of Reading, Berkshire, England. The service operates as a charity, and was founded in 1981 by a collaboration between the voluntary sector and Reading Borough Council.

References

External links
 
 ReadiBus website

Organizations established in 1981
Transport in Reading, Berkshire
Organisations based in Reading, Berkshire
Bus operators in Berkshire
Charities for disabled people based in the United Kingdom
Charities based in Berkshire